Ando Kiviberg (born on 28 July 1969) is an Estonian folk musician and politician.

Since 1993 he has been the main organizer of Viljandi Folk Music Festival.

From 2013 to 2017, he was the mayor of Viljandi. He has been a member of the party Isamaa.

In 2001 he was awarded with Order of the White Star, V class.

References

Living people
1969 births
Estonian musicians
Torupill players
21st-century Estonian musicians
20th-century Estonian musicians
Isamaa politicians
Mayors of places in Estonia
Recipients of the Order of the White Star, 5th Class
People from Rakvere